Dotcom may refer to:

 .com (short for "commercials"), a generic top-level Internet domain
 dot-com company, a company which does most of its business on the Internet
 dot-com bubble (also known as the dot-com era), a financial bubble running roughly from 1995 to 2001

Other
 .COM (short for "command"), a file extension associated with DOS executable file
 Kim Dotcom (born Kim Schmitz, born 1974), German-Finnish technology entrepreneur
 Walter "Dot Com" Slattery, a fictional character from 30 Rock
 Dot.Com (film), a 2008 Portuguese comedy
 Dot.Com (album), a 2000 album by The Residents
 Christopher Comstock (Marshmello), also known as "Dotcom", an American electronic dance music producer and DJ
 Rich Dotcom, a character in the NBC series Blindspot
Cloned pig in 2000

See also
 com (disambiguation)